Fainu (Dhivehi: ފައިނު) is one of the inhabited islands of Raa Atoll. Fainu is situated in Raa Atoll which is officially known as North Maalhosmadulu Atoll. The island is located between the Kinolhas and Inguraidhoo.

Ecology
Issues such as environmental degradation remain prominent. Maldives Human Development Report 2000 highlighted the poor irrigation system at place which is still unchanged. Also, Maldives State of the Environment Report 2002 highlighted the severe beach erosion problem faced by the island (notably the biggest island in Raa Atoll). Moreover, December 2004 - Indian Ocean tsunami left the island as the second most devastated in the atoll.

In 2018, a controversial project by the Maldivian government was set to destroy two-thirds of the vegetation of the island including dense jungle and cultivation land, to build an airport and luxury hotel on the island. The project will confine the residents of the island to just the settlement and they will lose access to half of the island's beach area. Activists have been campaigning raising concern about the need for the project when there is a domestic airport just 25 minutes away

Demography

Education
Being a small population, the island faces many challenges. Children's education remains a critical issue with every single child having to leave the island for secondary school. The first foreign teacher ever in the history of Fainu School started working in the academic year 2006.

Council 
R. Fainu Council 

http://www.fainucouncil.gov.mv/

Health
On 31 May 2004, the island won the award for no-smoking by the World Health Organization.

Gallery

References

 

Islands of the Maldives